Biby Mathew is a composer, singer, and lyrics writer in Malayalam films. He is one of the founders of the Malayalam Music composer's group, 4 Musics.

References 

Indian male playback singers
Singers from Kochi
1982 births
Living people